Iberian moths represent about 4,454 different types of moths. The moths (mostly nocturnal) and butterflies (mostly diurnal) together make up the taxonomic order Lepidoptera.

This is a list of moth species which have been recorded in Portugal, Spain and Gibraltar (together forming the Iberian Peninsula). This list also includes species found on the Balearic Islands.

Nepticulidae
Acalyptris minimella (Rebel, 1924)
Acalyptris platani (Muller-Rutz, 1934)
Acalyptris pyrenaica A. & Z. Lastuvka, 1993
Bohemannia pulverosella (Stainton, 1849)
Ectoedemia albifasciella (Heinemann, 1871)
Ectoedemia andalusiae van Nieukerken, 1985
Ectoedemia angulifasciella (Stainton, 1849)
Ectoedemia caradjai (Groschke, 1944)
Ectoedemia contorta van Nieukerken, 1985
Ectoedemia coscoja van Nieukerken, A. & Z. Lastuvka, 2010
Ectoedemia erythrogenella (de Joannis, 1908)
Ectoedemia hannoverella (Glitz, 1872)
Ectoedemia haraldi (Soffner, 1942)
Ectoedemia heringi (Toll, 1934)
Ectoedemia ilicis (Mendes, 1910)
Ectoedemia intimella (Zeller, 1848)
Ectoedemia leucothorax van Nieukerken, 1985
Ectoedemia occultella (Linnaeus, 1767)
Ectoedemia phaeolepis van Nieukerken, A. & Z. Lastuvka, 2010
Ectoedemia pubescivora (Weber, 1937)
Ectoedemia subbimaculella (Haworth, 1828)
Ectoedemia suberis (Stainton, 1869)
Ectoedemia turbidella (Zeller, 1848)
Ectoedemia decentella (Herrich-Schäffer, 1855)
Ectoedemia obtusa (Puplesis & Diskus, 1996)
Ectoedemia euphorbiella (Stainton, 1869)
Ectoedemia septembrella (Stainton, 1849)
Ectoedemia atrifrontella (Stainton, 1851)
Ectoedemia hispanica van Nieukerken, 1985
Ectoedemia liebwerdella Zimmermann, 1940
Ectoedemia liguricella Klimesch, 1953
Ectoedemia longicaudella Klimesch, 1953
Ectoedemia vivesi A.Lastuvka, Z. Lastuvka & van Nieukerken, 2010
Parafomoria cistivora (Peyerimhoff, 1871)
Parafomoria fumanae A. & Z. Lastuvka, 2005
Parafomoria halimivora van Nieukerken, 1985
Parafomoria ladaniphila (Mendes, 1910)
Parafomoria liguricella (Klimesch, 1946)
Parafomoria pseudocistivora van Nieukerken, 1983
Parafomoria tingitella (Walsingham, 1904)
Simplimorpha promissa (Staudinger, 1871)
Stigmella alaternella (Le Marchand, 1937)
Stigmella alnetella (Stainton, 1856)
Stigmella anomalella (Goeze, 1783)
Stigmella assimilella (Zeller, 1848)
Stigmella atricapitella (Haworth, 1828)
Stigmella aurella (Fabricius, 1775)
Stigmella auromarginella (Richardson, 1890)
Stigmella basiguttella (Heinemann, 1862)
Stigmella centifoliella (Zeller, 1848)
Stigmella crataegella (Klimesch, 1936)
Stigmella crenulatae (Klimesch, 1975)
Stigmella dorsiguttella (Johansson, 1971)
Stigmella eberhardi (Johansson, 1971)
Stigmella floslactella (Haworth, 1828)
Stigmella freyella (Heyden, 1858)
Stigmella glutinosae (Stainton, 1858)
Stigmella hemargyrella (Kollar, 1832)
Stigmella hybnerella (Hübner, 1796)
Stigmella ilicifoliella (Mendes, 1918)
Stigmella incognitella (Herrich-Schäffer, 1855)
Stigmella lapponica (Wocke, 1862)
Stigmella malella (Stainton, 1854)
Stigmella mespilicola (Frey, 1856)
Stigmella microtheriella (Stainton, 1854)
Stigmella nivenburgensis (Preissecker, 1942)
Stigmella obliquella (Heinemann, 1862)
Stigmella paradoxa (Frey, 1858)
Stigmella perpygmaeella (Doubleday, 1859)
Stigmella plagicolella (Stainton, 1854)
Stigmella regiella (Herrich-Schäffer, 1855)
Stigmella rhamnella (Herrich-Schäffer, 1860)
Stigmella roborella (Johansson, 1971)
Stigmella rolandi van Nieukerken, 1990
Stigmella salicis (Stainton, 1854)
Stigmella samiatella (Zeller, 1839)
Stigmella sorbi (Stainton, 1861)
Stigmella speciosa (Frey, 1858)
Stigmella suberivora (Stainton, 1869)
Stigmella thuringiaca (Petry, 1904)
Stigmella tiliae (Frey, 1856)
Stigmella tityrella (Stainton, 1854)
Stigmella trimaculella (Haworth, 1828)
Stigmella ulmivora (Fologne, 1860)
Stigmella vimineticola (Frey, 1856)
Trifurcula alypella Klimesch, 1975
Trifurcula andalusica Z. & A. Lastuvka, 2007
Trifurcula bleonella (Chretien, 1904)
Trifurcula bupleurella (Chretien, 1907)
Trifurcula corleyi Z. & A. Lastuvka, 2007
Trifurcula headleyella (Stainton, 1854)
Trifurcula lavandulae Z. & A. Lastuvka, 2007
Trifurcula melanoptera van Nieukerken & Puplesis, 1991
Trifurcula montana Z. Lastuvka, A. Lastuvka & Van Nieukerken, 2007
Trifurcula pederi Z. & A. Lastuvka, 2007
Trifurcula rosmarinella (Chretien, 1914)
Trifurcula salvifoliae Z. & A. Lastuvka, 2007
Trifurcula sanctibenedicti Klimesch, 1979
Trifurcula saturejae (Parenti, 1963)
Trifurcula stoechadella Klimesch, 1975
Trifurcula teucriella (Chretien, 1914)
Trifurcula thymi (Szocs, 1965)
Trifurcula anthyllidella Klimesch, 1975
Trifurcula cryptella (Stainton, 1856)
Trifurcula eurema (Tutt, 1899)
Trifurcula ortneri (Klimesch, 1951)
Trifurcula beirnei Puplesis, 1984
Trifurcula calycotomella A. & Z. Lastuvka, 1997
Trifurcula coronillae van Nieukerken, 1990
Trifurcula iberica van Nieukerken, 1990
Trifurcula immundella (Zeller, 1839)
Trifurcula josefklimeschi van Nieukerken, 1990
Trifurcula orientella Klimesch, 1953
Trifurcula pallidella (Duponchel, 1843)
Trifurcula silviae van Nieukerken, 1990
Trifurcula squamatella Stainton, 1849
Trifurcula subnitidella (Duponchel, 1843)
Trifurcula victoris van Nieukerken, 1990

Noctuidae
Abrostola asclepiadis (Denis & Schiffermuller, 1775)
Abrostola tripartita (Hufnagel, 1766)
Abrostola triplasia (Linnaeus, 1758)
Acontia lucida (Hufnagel, 1766)
Acontia trabealis (Scopoli, 1763)
Acontia viridisquama Guenee, 1852
Acosmetia caliginosa (Hübner, 1813)
Acronicta aceris (Linnaeus, 1758)
Acronicta leporina (Linnaeus, 1758)
Acronicta strigosa (Denis & Schiffermuller, 1775)
Acronicta alni (Linnaeus, 1767)
Acronicta cuspis (Hübner, 1813)
Acronicta psi (Linnaeus, 1758)
Acronicta tridens (Denis & Schiffermuller, 1775)
Acronicta auricoma (Denis & Schiffermuller, 1775)
Acronicta euphorbiae (Denis & Schiffermuller, 1775)
Acronicta rumicis (Linnaeus, 1758)
Actebia fugax (Treitschke, 1825)
Actebia photophila (Guenee, 1852)
Actinotia polyodon (Clerck, 1759)
Actinotia radiosa (Esper, 1804)
Aedia funesta (Esper, 1786)
Aedia leucomelas (Linnaeus, 1758)
Aegle vespertinalis (Rambur, 1858)
Agrochola lychnidis (Denis & Schiffermuller, 1775)
Agrochola helvola (Linnaeus, 1758)
Agrochola litura (Linnaeus, 1758)
Agrochola lunosa (Haworth, 1809)
Agrochola meridionalis (Staudinger, 1871)
Agrochola orejoni Agenjo, 1951
Agrochola pistacinoides (d'Aubuisson, 1867)
Agrochola haematidea (Duponchel, 1827)
Agrochola blidaensis (Stertz, 1915)
Agrochola lota (Clerck, 1759)
Agrochola macilenta (Hübner, 1809)
Agrochola circellaris (Hufnagel, 1766)
Agrotis alexandriensis Baker, 1894
Agrotis bigramma (Esper, 1790)
Agrotis boetica (Rambur, 1837)
Agrotis charoae Yela, Fibiger, Zilli & Ronkay, 2010
Agrotis chretieni (Dumont, 1903)
Agrotis cinerea (Denis & Schiffermuller, 1775)
Agrotis clavis (Hufnagel, 1766)
Agrotis exclamationis (Linnaeus, 1758)
Agrotis fatidica (Hübner, 1824)
Agrotis graslini Rambur, 1848
Agrotis herzogi Rebel, 1911
Agrotis ipsilon (Hufnagel, 1766)
Agrotis lasserrei (Oberthür, 1881)
Agrotis lata Treitschke, 1835
Agrotis obesa Boisduval, 1829
Agrotis pierreti (Bugnion, 1838)
Agrotis puta (Hübner, 1803)
Agrotis ripae Hübner, 1823
Agrotis sabulosa Rambur, 1837
Agrotis schawerdai Bytinski-Salz, 1937
Agrotis segetum (Denis & Schiffermuller, 1775)
Agrotis simplonia (Geyer, 1832)
Agrotis spinifera (Hübner, 1808)
Agrotis trux (Hübner, 1824)
Agrotis turatii Standfuss, 1888
Agrotis vestigialis (Hufnagel, 1766)
Agrotis yelai Fibiger, 1990
Allophyes alfaroi Agenjo, 1951
Alvaradoia disjecta (Rothschild, 1920)
Amephana anarrhini (Duponchel, 1840)
Amephana aurita (Fabricius, 1787)
Ammoconia caecimacula (Denis & Schiffermuller, 1775)
Ammoconia senex (Geyer, 1828)
Ammopolia witzenmanni (Standfuss, 1890)
Amphipoea oculea (Linnaeus, 1761)
Amphipyra berbera Rungs, 1949
Amphipyra effusa Boisduval, 1828
Amphipyra livida (Denis & Schiffermuller, 1775)
Amphipyra pyramidea (Linnaeus, 1758)
Amphipyra tetra (Fabricius, 1787)
Amphipyra tragopoginis (Clerck, 1759)
Amphipyra cinnamomea (Goeze, 1781)
Anaplectoides prasina (Denis & Schiffermuller, 1775)
Anarta myrtilli (Linnaeus, 1761)
Anarta dianthi (Tauscher, 1809)
Anarta gredosi (de Laever, 1977)
Anarta odontites (Boisduval, 1829)
Anarta pugnax (Hübner, 1824)
Anarta sodae (Rambur, 1829)
Anarta trifolii (Hufnagel, 1766)
Anorthoa munda (Denis & Schiffermuller, 1775)
Anthracia ephialtes (Hübner, 1822)
Antitype chi (Linnaeus, 1758)
Apamea alpigena (Boisduval, 1837)
Apamea anceps (Denis & Schiffermuller, 1775)
Apamea aquila Donzel, 1837
Apamea arabs Oberthür, 1881
Apamea crenata (Hufnagel, 1766)
Apamea epomidion (Haworth, 1809)
Apamea furva (Denis & Schiffermuller, 1775)
Apamea illyria Freyer, 1846
Apamea lateritia (Hufnagel, 1766)
Apamea lithoxylaea (Denis & Schiffermuller, 1775)
Apamea maillardi (Geyer, 1834)
Apamea monoglypha (Hufnagel, 1766)
Apamea platinea (Treitschke, 1825)
Apamea remissa (Hübner, 1809)
Apamea scolopacina (Esper, 1788)
Apamea sordens (Hufnagel, 1766)
Apamea sublustris (Esper, 1788)
Apamea syriaca (Osthelder, 1933)
Apamea unanimis (Hübner, 1813)
Apamea zeta (Treitschke, 1825)
Aporophyla australis (Boisduval, 1829)
Aporophyla chioleuca (Herrich-Schäffer, 1850)
Aporophyla lueneburgensis (Freyer, 1848)
Aporophyla nigra (Haworth, 1809)
Apterogenum ypsillon (Denis & Schiffermuller, 1775)
Archanara dissoluta (Treitschke, 1825)
Asteroscopus sphinx (Hufnagel, 1766)
Atethmia algirica (Culot, 1917)
Atethmia centrago (Haworth, 1809)
Athetis pallustris (Hübner, 1808)
Athetis hospes (Freyer, 1831)
Atypha pulmonaris (Esper, 1790)
Auchmis detersa (Esper, 1787)
Autographa aemula (Denis & Schiffermuller, 1775)
Autographa bractea (Denis & Schiffermuller, 1775)
Autographa gamma (Linnaeus, 1758)
Autographa jota (Linnaeus, 1758)
Autographa pulchrina (Haworth, 1809)
Axylia putris (Linnaeus, 1761)
Brachygalea albolineata (Blachier, 1905)
Brachylomia viminalis (Fabricius, 1776)
Brithys crini (Fabricius, 1775)
Bryonycta pineti (Staudinger, 1859)
Bryophila ereptricula Treitschke, 1825
Bryophila gea (Schawerda, 1934)
Bryophila raptricula (Denis & Schiffermuller, 1775)
Bryophila ravula (Hübner, 1813)
Bryophila vandalusiae Duponchel, 1842
Bryophila domestica (Hufnagel, 1766)
Bryophila microglossa (Rambur, 1858)
Bryophila petrea Guenee, 1852
Calamia tridens (Hufnagel, 1766)
Callopistria juventina (Stoll, 1782)
Callopistria latreillei (Duponchel, 1827)
Calophasia almoravida Graslin, 1863
Calophasia hamifera Staudinger, 1863
Calophasia lunula (Hufnagel, 1766)
Calophasia opalina (Esper, 1793)
Calophasia platyptera (Esper, 1788)
Caradrina germainii (Duponchel, 1835)
Caradrina morpheus (Hufnagel, 1766)
Caradrina armeniaca (Boursin, 1936)
Caradrina distigma (Chretien, 1913)
Caradrina flava Oberthür, 1876
Caradrina ibeasi (Fernandez, 1918)
Caradrina ingrata Staudinger, 1897
Caradrina clavipalpis Scopoli, 1763
Caradrina flavirena Guenee, 1852
Caradrina fuscicornis Rambur, 1832
Caradrina noctivaga Bellier, 1863
Caradrina selini Boisduval, 1840
Caradrina wullschlegeli Pungeler, 1903
Caradrina aspersa Rambur, 1834
Caradrina kadenii Freyer, 1836
Caradrina proxima Rambur, 1837
Caradrina terrea Freyer, 1840
Cardepia affinis (Rothschild, 1913)
Cardepia sociabilis (de Graslin, 1850)
Ceramica pisi (Linnaeus, 1758)
Cerapteryx graminis (Linnaeus, 1758)
Cerastis faceta (Treitschke, 1835)
Cerastis rubricosa (Denis & Schiffermuller, 1775)
Charanyca trigrammica (Hufnagel, 1766)
Charanyca ferruginea (Esper, 1785)
Chersotis alpestris (Boisduval, 1837)
Chersotis anatolica (Draudt, 1936)
Chersotis cuprea (Denis & Schiffermuller, 1775)
Chersotis elegans (Eversmann, 1837)
Chersotis fimbriola (Esper, 1803)
Chersotis larixia (Guenee, 1852)
Chersotis margaritacea (Villers, 1789)
Chersotis multangula (Hübner, 1803)
Chersotis ocellina (Denis & Schiffermuller, 1775)
Chersotis oreina Dufay, 1984
Chilodes maritima (Tauscher, 1806)
Chloantha hyperici (Denis & Schiffermuller, 1775)
Chrysodeixis chalcites (Esper, 1789)
Cleoceris scoriacea (Esper, 1789)
Cleonymia baetica (Rambur, 1837)
Cleonymia diffluens (Staudinger, 1870)
Cleonymia korbi (Staudinger, 1895)
Cleonymia pectinicornis (Staudinger, 1859)
Cleonymia yvanii (Duponchel, 1833)
Coenobia rufa (Haworth, 1809)
Colocasia coryli (Linnaeus, 1758)
Condica viscosa (Freyer, 1831)
Conisania renati (Oberthür, 1890)
Conisania andalusica (Staudinger, 1859)
Conistra alicia Lajonquiere, 1939
Conistra daubei (Duponchel, 1838)
Conistra gallica (Lederer, 1857)
Conistra haleae Fibiger & Top-Jensen, 2010
Conistra intricata (Boisduval, 1829)
Conistra ligula (Esper, 1791)
Conistra rubiginosa (Scopoli, 1763)
Conistra vaccinii (Linnaeus, 1761)
Conistra erythrocephala (Denis & Schiffermuller, 1775)
Conistra rubiginea (Denis & Schiffermuller, 1775)
Conistra staudingeri (Graslin, 1863)
Conistra torrida (Lederer, 1857)
Coranarta restricta Yela, 2002
Cosmia trapezina (Linnaeus, 1758)
Cosmia diffinis (Linnaeus, 1767)
Cosmia pyralina (Denis & Schiffermuller, 1775)
Cosmia affinis (Linnaeus, 1767)
Craniophora ligustri (Denis & Schiffermuller, 1775)
Craniophora pontica (Staudinger, 1878)
Cryphia fraudatricula (Hübner, 1803)
Cryphia lusitanica (Draudt, 1931)
Cryphia simulatricula (Guenee, 1852)
Cryphia algae (Fabricius, 1775)
Cryphia ochsi (Boursin, 1940)
Cryphia pallida (Baker, 1894)
Ctenoplusia accentifera (Lefebvre, 1827)
Ctenoplusia limbirena (Guenee, 1852)
Cucullia absinthii (Linnaeus, 1761)
Cucullia achilleae Guenee, 1852
Cucullia argentea (Hufnagel, 1766)
Cucullia artemisiae (Hufnagel, 1766)
Cucullia asteris (Denis & Schiffermuller, 1775)
Cucullia bubaceki Kitt, 1925
Cucullia calendulae Treitschke, 1835
Cucullia campanulae Freyer, 1831
Cucullia cemenelensis Boursin, 1923
Cucullia chamomillae (Denis & Schiffermuller, 1775)
Cucullia dracunculi (Hübner, 1813)
Cucullia gnaphalii (Hübner, 1813)
Cucullia lactucae (Denis & Schiffermuller, 1775)
Cucullia lucifuga (Denis & Schiffermuller, 1775)
Cucullia santolinae Rambur, 1834
Cucullia tanaceti (Denis & Schiffermuller, 1775)
Cucullia umbratica (Linnaeus, 1758)
Cucullia xeranthemi Boisduval, 1840
Cucullia caninae Rambur, 1833
Cucullia erythrocephala Wagner, 1914
Cucullia lanceolata (Villers, 1789)
Cucullia lychnitis Rambur, 1833
Cucullia reisseri Boursin, 1933
Cucullia scrophulariae (Denis & Schiffermuller, 1775)
Cucullia scrophulariphila Staudinger, 1859
Cucullia verbasci (Linnaeus, 1758)
Dasypolia templi (Thunberg, 1792)
Deltote bankiana (Fabricius, 1775)
Deltote pygarga (Hufnagel, 1766)
Denticucullus mabillei (D. Lucas, 1907)
Denticucullus pygmina (Haworth, 1809)
Diachrysia chrysitis (Linnaeus, 1758)
Diachrysia chryson (Esper, 1789)
Diachrysia nadeja (Oberthür, 1880)
Diachrysia stenochrysis (Warren, 1913)
Diarsia brunnea (Denis & Schiffermuller, 1775)
Diarsia florida (F. Schmidt, 1859)
Diarsia guadarramensis (Boursin, 1928)
Diarsia mendica (Fabricius, 1775)
Diarsia rubi (Vieweg, 1790)
Dichagyris flammatra (Denis & Schiffermuller, 1775)
Dichagyris musiva (Hübner, 1803)
Dichagyris candelisequa (Denis & Schiffermuller, 1775)
Dichagyris constanti (Milliere, 1860)
Dichagyris fidelis (de Joannis, 1903)
Dichagyris forcipula (Denis & Schiffermuller, 1775)
Dichagyris imperator (A. Bang-Haas, 1912)
Dichagyris nigrescens (Hofner, 1888)
Dichagyris renigera (Hübner, 1808)
Dichagyris romanovi (Christoph, 1885)
Dichagyris signifera (Denis & Schiffermuller, 1775)
Dichagyris mansoura (Chretien, 1911)
Dichonia aeruginea (Hübner, 1808)
Dichonia convergens (Denis & Schiffermuller, 1775)
Dicycla oo (Linnaeus, 1758)
Diloba caeruleocephala (Linnaeus, 1758)
Dryobota labecula (Esper, 1788)
Dryobotodes tenebrosa (Esper, 1789)
Dryobotodes eremita (Fabricius, 1775)
Dryobotodes monochroma (Esper, 1790)
Dryobotodes roboris (Geyer, 1835)
Dypterygia scabriuscula (Linnaeus, 1758)
Egira conspicillaris (Linnaeus, 1758)
Elaphria venustula (Hübner, 1790)
Enargia abluta (Hübner, 1808)
Enargia paleacea (Esper, 1788)
Enterpia laudeti (Boisduval, 1840)
Epilecta linogrisea (Denis & Schiffermuller, 1775)
Epimecia ustula (Freyer, 1835)
Epipsilia cervantes (Reisser, 1935)
Epipsilia grisescens (Fabricius, 1794)
Epipsilia latens (Hübner, 1809)
Episema glaucina (Esper, 1789)
Episema grueneri Boisduval, 1837
Eremobia ochroleuca (Denis & Schiffermuller, 1775)
Eremohadena chenopodiphaga (Rambur, 1832)
Eremohadena halimi (Milliere, 1877)
Eremohadena roseonitens (Oberthür, 1887)
Eremohadena mariana (Lajonquiere, 1964)
Eremopola orana (H. Lucas, 1848)
Eremopola lenis (Staudinger, 1892)
Eucarta amethystina (Hübner, 1803)
Euchalcia modestoides Poole, 1989
Euchalcia variabilis (Piller, 1783)
Eucoptocnemis optabilis (Boisduval, 1834)
Eugnorisma glareosa (Esper, 1788)
Eugnorisma arenoflavida (Schawerda, 1934)
Eugnorisma depuncta (Linnaeus, 1761)
Euplexia lucipara (Linnaeus, 1758)
Eupsilia transversa (Hufnagel, 1766)
Eurois occulta (Linnaeus, 1758)
Euxoa aquilina (Denis & Schiffermuller, 1775)
Euxoa canariensis Rebel, 1902
Euxoa conspicua (Hübner, 1824)
Euxoa cos (Hübner, 1824)
Euxoa culminicola (Staudinger, 1870)
Euxoa decora (Denis & Schiffermuller, 1775)
Euxoa eruta (Hübner, 1817)
Euxoa hastifera (Donzel, 1847)
Euxoa mendelis Fernandez, 1915
Euxoa nigricans (Linnaeus, 1761)
Euxoa nigrofusca (Esper, 1788)
Euxoa obelisca (Denis & Schiffermuller, 1775)
Euxoa oranaria (A. Bang-Haas, 1906)
Euxoa powelli (Oberthür, 1912)
Euxoa recussa (Hübner, 1817)
Euxoa temera (Hübner, 1808)
Euxoa tritici (Linnaeus, 1761)
Euxoa vitta (Esper, 1789)
Euxoa wagneri Corti, 1926
Euxoa continentalis Reisser, 1935
Euxoa nevadensis Corti, 1928
Evisa schawerdae Reisser, 1930
Galgula partita Guenee, 1852
Globia algae (Esper, 1789)
Globia sparganii (Esper, 1790)
Gortyna borelii Pierret, 1837
Gortyna flavago (Denis & Schiffermuller, 1775)
Gortyna puengeleri (Turati, 1909)
Gortyna xanthenes Germar, 1842
Graphiphora augur (Fabricius, 1775)
Griposia aprilina (Linnaeus, 1758)
Hada plebeja (Linnaeus, 1761)
Hadena irregularis (Hufnagel, 1766)
Hadena nevadae (Draudt, 1933)
Hadena perplexa (Denis & Schiffermuller, 1775)
Hadena ruetimeyeri Boursin, 1951
Hadena sancta (Staudinger, 1859)
Hadena silenes (Hübner, 1822)
Hadena albimacula (Borkhausen, 1792)
Hadena archaica Hacker, 1996
Hadena bicruris (Hufnagel, 1766)
Hadena caesia (Denis & Schiffermuller, 1775)
Hadena clara (Staudinger, 1901)
Hadena compta (Denis & Schiffermuller, 1775)
Hadena confusa (Hufnagel, 1766)
Hadena consparcatoides (Schawerda, 1928)
Hadena filograna (Esper, 1788)
Hadena luteocincta (Rambur, 1834)
Hadena magnolii (Boisduval, 1829)
Hadena orihuela Hacker, 1996
Hadena vulcanica (Turati, 1907)
Hadena wehrlii (Draudt, 1934)
Hadena tephroleuca (Boisduval, 1833)
Hadena silenides (Staudinger, 1895)
Hadjina wichti (Hirschke, 1903)
Haemerosia renalis (Hübner, 1813)
Harpagophana hilaris (Staudinger, 1895)
Hecatera bicolorata (Hufnagel, 1766)
Hecatera cappa (Hübner, 1809)
Hecatera dysodea (Denis & Schiffermuller, 1775)
Hecatera weissi (Draudt, 1934)
Helicoverpa armigera (Hübner, 1808)
Heliothis incarnata Freyer, 1838
Heliothis maritima Graslin, 1855
Heliothis nubigera Herrich-Schäffer, 1851
Heliothis peltigera (Denis & Schiffermuller, 1775)
Heliothis viriplaca (Hufnagel, 1766)
Helotropha leucostigma (Hübner, 1808)
Heterophysa dumetorum (Geyer, 1834)
Hoplodrina ambigua (Denis & Schiffermuller, 1775)
Hoplodrina blanda (Denis & Schiffermuller, 1775)
Hoplodrina hesperica Dufay & Boursin, 1960
Hoplodrina octogenaria (Goeze, 1781)
Hoplodrina respersa (Denis & Schiffermuller, 1775)
Hoplodrina superstes (Ochsenheimer, 1816)
Hydraecia micacea (Esper, 1789)
Hydraecia osseola Staudinger, 1882
Hyppa rectilinea (Esper, 1788)
Ipimorpha retusa (Linnaeus, 1761)
Ipimorpha subtusa (Denis & Schiffermuller, 1775)
Jodia croceago (Denis & Schiffermuller, 1775)
Lacanobia contigua (Denis & Schiffermuller, 1775)
Lacanobia suasa (Denis & Schiffermuller, 1775)
Lacanobia thalassina (Hufnagel, 1766)
Lacanobia aliena (Hübner, 1809)
Lacanobia blenna (Hübner, 1824)
Lacanobia oleracea (Linnaeus, 1758)
Lacanobia splendens (Hübner, 1808)
Lacanobia w-latinum (Hufnagel, 1766)
Lamprosticta culta (Denis & Schiffermuller, 1775)
Lasionycta imbecilla (Fabricius, 1794)
Lasionycta proxima (Hübner, 1809)
Lateroligia ophiogramma (Esper, 1794)
Lenisa geminipuncta (Haworth, 1809)
Leucania loreyi (Duponchel, 1827)
Leucania comma (Linnaeus, 1761)
Leucania joannisi Boursin & Rungs, 1952
Leucania obsoleta (Hübner, 1803)
Leucania punctosa (Treitschke, 1825)
Leucania putrescens (Hübner, 1824)
Leucania zeae (Duponchel, 1827)
Leucochlaena oditis (Hübner, 1822)
Lithophane furcifera (Hufnagel, 1766)
Lithophane merckii (Rambur, 1832)
Lithophane ornitopus (Hufnagel, 1766)
Lithophane semibrunnea (Haworth, 1809)
Lithophane socia (Hufnagel, 1766)
Lithophane leautieri (Boisduval, 1829)
Litoligia literosa (Haworth, 1809)
Lophoterges millierei (Staudinger, 1871)
Luperina dumerilii (Duponchel, 1826)
Luperina nickerlii (Freyer, 1845)
Luperina testacea (Denis & Schiffermuller, 1775)
Lycophotia erythrina (Herrich-Schäffer, 1852)
Lycophotia molothina (Esper, 1789)
Lycophotia porphyrea (Denis & Schiffermuller, 1775)
Macdunnoughia confusa (Stephens, 1850)
Mamestra brassicae (Linnaeus, 1758)
Meganephria bimaculosa (Linnaeus, 1767)
Melanchra persicariae (Linnaeus, 1761)
Mesapamea remmi Rezbanyai-Reser, 1985
Mesapamea secalella Remm, 1983
Mesapamea secalis (Linnaeus, 1758)
Mesogona acetosellae (Denis & Schiffermuller, 1775)
Mesogona oxalina (Hübner, 1803)
Mesoligia furuncula (Denis & Schiffermuller, 1775)
Metopoceras felicina (Donzel, 1844)
Metopoceras tabernas Fibiger, Yela, Zilli & Ronkay, 2010
Metopoceras albarracina Hampson, 1918
Metopoceras khalildja Oberthür, 1884
Mniotype adusta (Esper, 1790)
Mniotype fulva (Rothschild, 1914)
Mniotype occidentalis Yela, Fibiger, Ronkay & Zilli, 2010
Mniotype satura (Denis & Schiffermuller, 1775)
Moma alpium (Osbeck, 1778)
Mormo maura (Linnaeus, 1758)
Mythimna riparia (Rambur, 1829)
Mythimna albipuncta (Denis & Schiffermuller, 1775)
Mythimna algirica (Oberthür, 1918)
Mythimna congrua (Hübner, 1817)
Mythimna ferrago (Fabricius, 1787)
Mythimna l-album (Linnaeus, 1767)
Mythimna litoralis (Curtis, 1827)
Mythimna umbrigera (Saalmuller, 1891)
Mythimna languida (Walker, 1858)
Mythimna conigera (Denis & Schiffermuller, 1775)
Mythimna impura (Hübner, 1808)
Mythimna pallens (Linnaeus, 1758)
Mythimna pudorina (Denis & Schiffermuller, 1775)
Mythimna straminea (Treitschke, 1825)
Mythimna turca (Linnaeus, 1761)
Mythimna vitellina (Hübner, 1808)
Mythimna prominens (Walker, 1856)
Mythimna unipuncta (Haworth, 1809)
Mythimna andereggii (Boisduval, 1840)
Mythimna sicula (Treitschke, 1835)
Naenia typica (Linnaeus, 1758)
Noctua comes Hübner, 1813
Noctua fimbriata (Schreber, 1759)
Noctua interjecta Hübner, 1803
Noctua interposita (Hübner, 1790)
Noctua janthe (Borkhausen, 1792)
Noctua janthina Denis & Schiffermuller, 1775
Noctua orbona (Hufnagel, 1766)
Noctua pronuba (Linnaeus, 1758)
Noctua tirrenica Biebinger, Speidel & Hanigk, 1983
Nonagria typhae (Thunberg, 1784)
Nyctobrya muralis (Forster, 1771)
Ochropleura leucogaster (Freyer, 1831)
Ochropleura plecta (Linnaeus, 1761)
Oligia fasciuncula (Haworth, 1809)
Oligia latruncula (Denis & Schiffermuller, 1775)
Oligia strigilis (Linnaeus, 1758)
Oligia versicolor (Borkhausen, 1792)
Olivenebula xanthochloris (Boisduval, 1840)
Omia banghaasi Stauder, 1930
Omia cyclopea (Graslin, 1837)
Omia cymbalariae (Hübner, 1809)
Omphalophana antirrhinii (Hübner, 1803)
Omphalophana serrata (Treitschke, 1835)
Oncocnemis nigricula (Eversmann, 1847)
Opigena polygona (Denis & Schiffermuller, 1775)
Oria musculosa (Hübner, 1808)
Orthosia gracilis (Denis & Schiffermuller, 1775)
Orthosia opima (Hübner, 1809)
Orthosia cerasi (Fabricius, 1775)
Orthosia cruda (Denis & Schiffermuller, 1775)
Orthosia miniosa (Denis & Schiffermuller, 1775)
Orthosia populeti (Fabricius, 1775)
Orthosia incerta (Hufnagel, 1766)
Orthosia gothica (Linnaeus, 1758)
Oxicesta serratae (Zerny, 1927)
Oxytripia orbiculosa (Esper, 1799)
Pachetra sagittigera (Hufnagel, 1766)
Panchrysia aurea (Hübner, 1803)
Panchrysia v-argenteum (Esper, 1798)
Panemeria tenebrata (Scopoli, 1763)
Panolis flammea (Denis & Schiffermuller, 1775)
Papestra biren (Goeze, 1781)
Parastichtis suspecta (Hübner, 1817)
Pardoxia graellsi (Feisthamel, 1837)
Peridroma saucia (Hübner, 1808)
Perigrapha rorida Frivaldszky, 1835
Periphanes delphinii (Linnaeus, 1758)
Phlogophora meticulosa (Linnaeus, 1758)
Photedes captiuncula (Treitschke, 1825)
Photedes dulcis (Oberthür, 1918)
Photedes minima (Haworth, 1809)
Photedes morrisii (Dale, 1837)
Phyllophila obliterata (Rambur, 1833)
Plusia festucae (Linnaeus, 1758)
Polia bombycina (Hufnagel, 1766)
Polia hepatica (Clerck, 1759)
Polia nebulosa (Hufnagel, 1766)
Polychrysia moneta (Fabricius, 1787)
Polymixis lichenea (Hübner, 1813)
Polymixis argillaceago (Hübner, 1822)
Polymixis dubia (Duponchel, 1836)
Polymixis flavicincta (Denis & Schiffermuller, 1775)
Polymixis germana (Rothschild, 1914)
Polymixis xanthomista (Hübner, 1819)
Polyphaenis sericata (Esper, 1787)
Protolampra sobrina (Duponchel, 1843)
Protoschinia scutosa (Denis & Schiffermuller, 1775)
Pseudenargia ulicis (Staudinger, 1859)
Pseudozarba bipartita (Herrich-Schäffer, 1850)
Pyrrhia umbra (Hufnagel, 1766)
Raphia hybris (Hübner, 1813)
Recoropha canteneri (Duponchel, 1833)
Rhiza commoda Staudinger, 1889
Rhizedra lutosa (Hübner, 1803)
Rhyacia helvetina (Boisduval, 1833)
Rhyacia lucipeta (Denis & Schiffermuller, 1775)
Rhyacia simulans (Hufnagel, 1766)
Saragossa seeboldi Staudinger, 1900
Schinia cardui (Hübner, 1790)
Scotochrosta pulla (Denis & Schiffermuller, 1775)
Sesamia cretica Lederer, 1857
Sesamia nonagrioides Lefebvre, 1827
Sideridis rivularis (Fabricius, 1775)
Sideridis implexa (Hübner, 1809)
Sideridis reticulata (Goeze, 1781)
Sideridis turbida (Esper, 1790)
Simyra albovenosa (Goeze, 1781)
Spaelotis ravida (Denis & Schiffermuller, 1775)
Spaelotis senna (Freyer, 1829)
Spodoptera cilium Guenee, 1852
Spodoptera exigua (Hübner, 1808)
Spodoptera littoralis (Boisduval, 1833)
Standfussiana dalmata (Staudinger, 1901)
Standfussiana lucernea (Linnaeus, 1758)
Stilbia andalusiaca Staudinger, 1892
Stilbia anomala (Haworth, 1812)
Stilbia philopalis Graslin, 1852
Subacronicta megacephala (Denis & Schiffermuller, 1775)
Syngrapha interrogationis (Linnaeus, 1758)
Synthymia fixa (Fabricius, 1787)
Teinoptera olivina (Herrich-Schäffer, 1852)
Thalerastria lehmanni Hoppe & Fibiger, 2009
Thalpophila matura (Hufnagel, 1766)
Thalpophila vitalba (Freyer, 1834)
Tholera cespitis (Denis & Schiffermuller, 1775)
Tholera decimalis (Poda, 1761)
Thysanoplusia daubei (Boisduval, 1840)
Thysanoplusia orichalcea (Fabricius, 1775)
Tiliacea aurago (Denis & Schiffermuller, 1775)
Tiliacea citrago (Linnaeus, 1758)
Tiliacea sulphurago (Denis & Schiffermuller, 1775)
Trachea atriplicis (Linnaeus, 1758)
Trichoplusia ni (Hübner, 1803)
Trichosea ludifica (Linnaeus, 1758)
Trigonophora haasi (Staudinger, 1892)
Trigonophora crassicornis (Oberthür, 1918)
Trigonophora flammea (Esper, 1785)
Trigonophora jodea (Herrich-Schäffer, 1850)
Tyta luctuosa (Denis & Schiffermuller, 1775)
Unchelea myodea (Rambur, 1858)
Valeria jaspidea (Villers, 1789)
Victrix agenjoi (Fernandez, 1931)
Xanthia austauti Oberthür, 1881
Xanthia gilvago (Denis & Schiffermuller, 1775)
Xanthia icteritia (Hufnagel, 1766)
Xanthia ocellaris (Borkhausen, 1792)
Xanthia ruticilla (Esper, 1791)
Xanthia togata (Esper, 1788)
Xanthodes albago (Fabricius, 1794)
Xestia ashworthii (Doubleday, 1855)
Xestia c-nigrum (Linnaeus, 1758)
Xestia ditrapezium (Denis & Schiffermuller, 1775)
Xestia triangulum (Hufnagel, 1766)
Xestia agathina (Duponchel, 1827)
Xestia baja (Denis & Schiffermuller, 1775)
Xestia castanea (Esper, 1798)
Xestia kermesina (Mabille, 1869)
Xestia ochreago (Hübner, 1809)
Xestia sexstrigata (Haworth, 1809)
Xestia stigmatica (Hübner, 1813)
Xestia trifida (Fischer v. Waldheim, 1820)
Xestia xanthographa (Denis & Schiffermuller, 1775)
Xylena buckwelli Rungs, 1952
Xylena exsoleta (Linnaeus, 1758)
Xylena vetusta (Hübner, 1813)
Xylocampa areola (Esper, 1789)

Nolidae
Bena bicolorana (Fuessly, 1775)
Earias clorana (Linnaeus, 1761)
Earias insulana (Boisduval, 1833)
Earias vernana (Fabricius, 1787)
Garella nilotica (Rogenhofer, 1882)
Meganola albula (Denis & Schiffermuller, 1775)
Meganola strigula (Denis & Schiffermuller, 1775)
Meganola togatulalis (Hübner, 1796)
Nola aerugula (Hübner, 1793)
Nola chlamitulalis (Hübner, 1813)
Nola cicatricalis (Treitschke, 1835)
Nola confusalis (Herrich-Schäffer, 1847)
Nola cristatula (Hübner, 1793)
Nola cucullatella (Linnaeus, 1758)
Nola squalida Staudinger, 1871
Nola subchlamydula Staudinger, 1871
Nola thymula Milliere, 1867
Nola tutulella Zerny, 1927
Nycteola asiatica (Krulikovsky, 1904)
Nycteola columbana (Turner, 1925)
Nycteola degenerana (Hübner, 1799)
Nycteola revayana (Scopoli, 1772)
Nycteola siculana (Fuchs, 1899)
Pseudoips prasinana (Linnaeus, 1758)

Notodontidae
Cerura erminea (Esper, 1783)
Cerura iberica (Templado & Ortiz, 1966)
Cerura vinula (Linnaeus, 1758)
Clostera anachoreta (Denis & Schiffermuller, 1775)
Clostera curtula (Linnaeus, 1758)
Clostera pigra (Hufnagel, 1766)
Dicranura ulmi (Denis & Schiffermuller, 1775)
Drymonia dodonaea (Denis & Schiffermuller, 1775)
Drymonia obliterata (Esper, 1785)
Drymonia querna (Denis & Schiffermuller, 1775)
Drymonia ruficornis (Hufnagel, 1766)
Drymonia velitaris (Hufnagel, 1766)
Furcula bicuspis (Borkhausen, 1790)
Furcula bifida (Brahm, 1787)
Furcula furcula (Clerck, 1759)
Gluphisia crenata (Esper, 1785)
Harpyia milhauseri (Fabricius, 1775)
Neoharpyia verbasci (Fabricius, 1798)
Notodonta dromedarius (Linnaeus, 1767)
Notodonta tritophus (Denis & Schiffermuller, 1775)
Notodonta ziczac (Linnaeus, 1758)
Odontosia carmelita (Esper, 1799)
Peridea anceps (Goeze, 1781)
Phalera bucephala (Linnaeus, 1758)
Phalera bucephaloides (Ochsenheimer, 1810)
Pheosia gnoma (Fabricius, 1776)
Pheosia tremula (Clerck, 1759)
Pterostoma palpina (Clerck, 1759)
Ptilodon capucina (Linnaeus, 1758)
Ptilodon cucullina (Denis & Schiffermuller, 1775)
Ptilophora plumigera (Denis & Schiffermuller, 1775)
Rhegmatophila alpina (Bellier, 1881)
Spatalia argentina (Denis & Schiffermuller, 1775)
Stauropus fagi (Linnaeus, 1758)
Thaumetopoea herculeana (Rambur, 1840)
Thaumetopoea pinivora (Treitschke, 1834)
Thaumetopoea pityocampa (Denis & Schiffermuller, 1775)
Thaumetopoea processionea (Linnaeus, 1758)

Oecophoridae
Alabonia chapmani Walsingham, 1903
Alabonia herculeella Walsingham, 1903
Alabonia staintoniella (Zeller, 1850)
Aplota palpella (Haworth, 1828)
Batia lambdella (Donovan, 1793)
Batia lunaris (Haworth, 1828)
Bisigna procerella (Denis & Schiffermuller, 1775)
Borkhausenia gredoensis Rebel, 1937
Borkhausenia minutella (Linnaeus, 1758)
Borkhausenia nefrax Hodges, 1974
Borkhausenia predotai Hartig, 1936
Crassa unitella (Hübner, 1796)
Dasycera oliviella (Fabricius, 1794)
Decantha iagathella (Walsingham, 1903)
Decantha luquetiella Vives, 1986
Denisia aragonella (Chretien, 1903)
Denisia augustella (Hübner, 1796)
Denisia fiduciella (Rebel, 1935)
Denisia subaquilea (Stainton, 1849)
Endrosis sarcitrella (Linnaeus, 1758)
Epicallima formosella (Denis & Schiffermuller, 1775)
Epicallima mercedella (Staudinger, 1859)
Epicallima mikkolai (Lvovsky, 1995)
Esperia sulphurella (Fabricius, 1775)
Goidanichiana jourdheuillella (Ragonot, 1875)
Harpella forficella (Scopoli, 1763)
Herrichia excelsella Staudinger, 1871
Hofmannophila pseudospretella (Stainton, 1849)
Kasyniana griseosericeella (Ragonot, 1879)
Kasyniana indistinctella (Rebel, 1902)
Minetia crinitus (Fabricius, 1798)
Oecophora bractella (Linnaeus, 1758)
Pleurota albarracina Rebel, 1917
Pleurota amaurodoxa Meyrick, 1935
Pleurota aristella (Linnaeus, 1767)
Pleurota bicostella (Clerck, 1759)
Pleurota ericella (Duponchel, 1839)
Pleurota eximia Lederer, 1861
Pleurota gallicella Huemer & Luquet, 1995
Pleurota hebetella Ragonot, 1889
Pleurota honorella (Hübner, 1813)
Pleurota nobilella Rebel, 1900
Pleurota planella (Staudinger, 1859)
Pleurota protasella Staudinger, 1883
Pleurota proteella Staudinger, 1880
Pleurota pungitiella Herrich-Schäffer, 1854
Pleurota pyropella (Denis & Schiffermuller, 1775)
Pleurota sobriella (Staudinger, 1859)
Pleurota teligerella (Staudinger, 1859)
Pleurota glitzella (Staudinger, 1883)
Pleurota pleurotella (Staudinger, 1871)
Pleurota punctella (O. Costa, 1836)
Pseudocryptolechia sareptensis (Moschler, 1862)
Schiffermuelleria schaefferella (Linnaeus, 1758)

Opostegidae
Opostega salaciella (Treitschke, 1833)
Opostega spatulella Herrich-Schäffer, 1855
Opostegoides menthinella (Mann, 1855)
Pseudopostega chalcopepla (Walsingham, 1908)
Pseudopostega crepusculella (Zeller, 1839)

See also
List of Iberian butterflies

External links
Fauna Europaea

Iberia
Iberia N
Moths
Moths
Moths